Hatunqucha (Quechua hatun (in Bolivia always jatun) big, large qucha lake, "big lake", Hispanicized spelling Jatuncocha) is a lake in the Altiplano in South Peru. It lies in the Puno Region, Puno Province, Atuncolla District, north of Lake Umayo.

References 

Lakes of Peru
Lakes of Puno Region